Chris Ayer is a solo guitar artist.

Ayer attended The Potomac School from kindergarten until twelfth grade. A graduate of Stanford University, where he studied philosophy and music, Ayer began playing the guitar and writing songs when he was 18 years old. While at Stanford, Ayer also sang with the Stanford Mendicants, an all-male a cappella group. Ayer released his first EP, Static, in June 2003 (which sold over a thousand copies), a live album in 2004, an album of acoustic demos in 2005, and a self-produced EP entitled New Songs, which received national airplay.

His first full-length album, This Is The Place, was recorded in Nashville and produced by Jason Gantt (The Chieftains, Brooks & Dunn, Tim McGraw, Faith Hill).

Ayer was a winner in the folk category in the 2006 John Lennon Songwriting Contest for his original song "Evaporate". He performed two tours with MC Lars as a live guitarist and singer in the UK in 2006.

In January 2013, he was signed to Sony in the UK and Europe. He released another full-length album, The Noise, in March 2013. This album made it to number six on the iTunes Singer-Songwriter charts and has a 5-star rating. He toured the Netherlands with fellow musician Matt Simons in April 2013, and then toured in Switzerland and Italy for the rest of the spring.

Ayer's music has appeared in the web series Camp Abercorn.

Discography

Albums/EPs

References

External links
 Chris Ayer's Homepage – Official Website
 

1984 births
American male pop singers
American rock guitarists
American male guitarists
American male singer-songwriters
American rock singers
American rock songwriters
Living people
People from Stanford, California
21st-century American guitarists
21st-century American male singers
21st-century American singers
Singer-songwriters from California